Richard Rowley may refer to:
Richard Rowley (writer) (1877–1947), Irish writer
Richard Rowley (MP) (1812–1887), British politician
Richard Rowley (film director), documentary filmmaker
Dick Rowley (Richard William Morris Rowley), Irish footballer